Peumo is a Chilean city and commune in Cachapoal Province, O'Higgins Region. It is believed that Peumo was named for the vast amount of Cryptocarya alba, or Peumo trees, that grow there.

Demographics
Of these, 7,628 (54.7%) lived in urban areas and 6,320 (45.3%) in rural areas. The population grew by 8.6% (1,105 persons) between the 1992 and 2002 censuses.

Administration
As a commune, Peumo is a third-level administrative division of Chile administered by a municipal council, headed by an alcalde who is directly elected every four years. The current alcalde is Carlos Aliaga.

Within the electoral divisions of Chile, Peumo is represented in the Chamber of Deputies by Alejandra Sepúlveda (PRI) and Javier Macaya (UDI) as part of the 34th electoral district, together with San Fernando, Chimbarongo, San Vicente, Pichidegua and Las Cabras. The commune is represented in the Senate by Andrés Chadwick Piñera (UDI) and Juan Pablo Letelier Morel (PS) as part of the 9th senatorial constituency (O'Higgins Region).

References

External links
  Municipality of Peumo

Communes of Chile
Populated places in Cachapoal Province